To što vidiš to i jeste (What You See is What You Get) is the tenth studio album by the Serbian rock band Električni Orgazam, released in September 2010 by the Dom omladine Beograda record label. The album is the first one since Kako bubanj kaže to feature the keyboard player and vocalist Ljubomir Đukić.

The album is distributed unlike any of the previous band's releases. For the first two months it is only available as a throw-in gift with the purchase of m:ts mobile provider's pre-paid package that costs RSD200 (around €2 as of November 2010). After that, the album featuring an alternative cover sleeve as well as several additional tracks will be available through the regular label and its distribution channels.

Promotional video was recorded for the opening track, "Nemaš nikom ništa da daš (You have got nothing to give to anyone)".

Track listing 
All lyrics by Srđan Gojković, all music and arrangements by Branislav Petrović, Ljubomir Đukić and Srđan Gojković.

Personnel

Električni Orgazam 
 Švaba (Zoran Radomirović) — bass
 Pače (Blagoje Nedeljković) — drums
 Banana (Branislav Petrović) — guitar, vocals, harmonica, recorded by, edited by, bass [track 1]
 Gile (Srđan Gojković) — vocals, guitar, guitar [wah wah]
 Ljuba (Ljubomir Đukić) — vocals, keyboards

Additional personnel 
 Dragomir Mihailović "Gagi" — guitar [tracks 5 and 6]
 Vojislav Aralica — percussion, producer, mixed by
 Stefan Đinović — mixed by [assistant]

References 
 To što vidiš to i jeste at Discogs
 Album review at Mikrofonija

Električni Orgazam albums
2010 albums